Our Lady of Lourdes Catholic High School is a Grades 9–12 catholic secondary school in Guelph, Ontario, Canada and is part of the Wellington Catholic District School Board.  The commonly used abbreviation for the school's name is OLOL.

History
Founded in 1965 as a Junior School for Catholic students, it became a full high school in the mid-1980s. When the original Bishop Macdonell Catholic High School closed down in the mid-1990s, Lourdes inherited many of Bishop Mac's students, including Guelph Storm players, which led to a substantial increase in the school's population and the subsequent construction of a new wings in the early 1990s. Today, with the completion of the new Bishop Macdonell Catholic High School, most of the students come from the west end and some northern parts of Guelph.

Feeder schools
Students of St. Francis, St. Edmond Kenneth, St. Joseph Basciano (except boundary area south of Speed River),St. Peter in Guelph, Sacred heart in Guelph as well as St. Jack Wasson in Elora continue their Catholic education at Our Lady of Lourdes Catholic High School.

Student Executive
The Student Senate Executive comprises six executive members who serve to represent the students and provide them with an array of social events. Each year, students elect a senator to serve as their representative on the Student Senate of the Wellington Catholic District School Board Senators serve one-year terms and can also be elected to the role of Student Trustee, one of two positions on the local Board of Trustees.

External links
 Our Lady of Lourdes Catholic High School website
 Wellington Catholic District School Board: Our Lady of Lourdes Catholic High School

Catholic secondary schools in Ontario
High schools in Guelph
Educational institutions established in 1965
1965 establishments in Ontario